Liolaemus talampaya is a species of lizard in the family Iguanidae or the family Liolaemidae. The species is endemic to Argentina.

References

talampaya
Lizards of South America
Reptiles of Argentina
Endemic fauna of Argentina
Reptiles described in 2004
Taxa named by Luciano Javier Ávila
Taxa named by Mariana Morando
Taxa named by Jack W. Sites Jr.